MacKinlay is a surname. Notable people with the surname include:

Andrew MacKinlay (born 1949), British politician
Andrew MacKinlay (cricketer) (born 1967), South African cricketer
Craig Mackinlay (born 1966), British politician
James Mackinlay (1850–1917), English rugby union player
Jock D. Mackinlay (born 1952), American computer and information scientist
Leila Mackinlay (1910–1996), British writer of romance novels from 1930 to 1979
Shane Mackinlay (born 1965), Australian Catholic bishop

Given name
MacKinlay Kantor (1904–1977), born Benjamin McKinlay Kantor, American journalist, novelist, and screenwriter

See also
McKinlay
McKinley
Mackinlay's cuckoo-dove, (Macropygia mackinlayi)